Anthaxia is a genus of beetles in the family Buprestidae.

Subgenera 
There are three subgenera of Anthaxia:

 Anthaxia (Anthaxia) Eschscholtz, 1829
 Anthaxia (Haplanthaxia) Reitter, 1911
 Anthaxia (Melanthaxia) Richter, 1944

Species
The genus contains the following species:
Anthaxia abdita Bílý, 1982
Anthaxia abyssinica Théry, 1896
Anthaxia acaciae Fisher, 1935
Anthaxia acutangula Motschulsky, 1861
Anthaxia acutipennis Bílý, 2010
Anthaxia adenensis Bílý, 1973
Anthaxia adiyamana Svoboda, 1994
Anthaxia aenea Gory & Laporte, 1839
Anthaxia aeneocuprea Kerremans, 1913
Anthaxia aeneogaster Gory & Laporte, 1839
Anthaxia aeneopicea Kerremans, 1900
Anthaxia aenescens Casey, 1884
Anthaxia aethiopica Bílý, 2020
Anthaxia affabilis Kerremans, 1913
Anthaxia africandra Bílý & Kubáň, 2010
Anthaxia agilis Obenberger, 1958
Anthaxia akiyamai Bílý, 1989
Anthaxia aladin Obenberger, 1928
Anthaxia albovillosa Kerremans, 1913
Anthaxia alcmaeone Obenberger, 1938
Anthaxia alfieri Théry, 1929
Anthaxia altaica Cobos, 1968
Anthaxia alziari Magnani, 1993
Anthaxia amasina Daniel, 1903
Anthaxia amplithorax Kerremans, 1903
Anthaxia anadyomene Bílý & Kubá, 2004
Anthaxia analabensis Descarpentries, 1969
Anthaxia anatolica Chevrolat, 1838
Anthaxia andreinii Kerremans, 1907
Anthaxia andrewesi Obenberger, 1922
Anthaxia androyensis Descarpentries, 1967
Anthaxia angulaticollis Kurosawa, 1956
Anthaxia angulinota Bílý, 1984
Anthaxia angustipennis (Klug, 1829)
Anthaxia antamponensis Descarpentries, 1969
Anthaxia antennata Bílý, 2011
Anthaxia antinoe Cobos, 1953
Anthaxia antoinei Baudon, 1955
Anthaxia aprutiana Gerini, 1955
Anthaxia arakii Kurosawa, 1956
Anthaxia aresteni Baudon, 1959
Anthaxia ariadna Bílý, 1982
Anthaxia armeniaca Obenberger, 1929
Anthaxia aspera Bílý, 1977
Anthaxia astoreth Obenberger, 1934
Anthaxia asumarina Obenberger, 1928
Anthaxia aterrima Kerremans, 1903
Anthaxia atomaria Obenberger, 1922
Anthaxia aureoviridis Svoboda, 1994
Anthaxia auricollis Kerremans, 1903
Anthaxia auriventris Ballion, 1871
Anthaxia aurohumeralis Bílý, 2000
Anthaxia aurolanata Bílý, 1980
Anthaxia auroscutellata Obenberger, 1938
Anthaxia auroviolacea Bílý, 2011
Anthaxia baconis Thomson, 1879
Anthaxia badghyzica Bílý, 1991
Anthaxia baicalensis Obenberger, 1938
Anthaxia baiocchii Magnani & Izzillo, 1998
Anthaxia bambisina Obenberger, 1928
Anthaxia barbieri Descarpentries, 1958
Anthaxia barri Bílý, 1995
Anthaxia baudoni Herman, 1966
Anthaxia baumi Obenberger, 1928
Anthaxia baumiella Obenberger, 1939
Anthaxia bedeli Abeille de Perrin, 1893
Anthaxia beesoni Obenberger, 1928
Anthaxia beesoniana Gebhardt, 1926
Anthaxia bekilyensis Descarpentries, 1967
Anthaxia belalonensis Descarpentries, 1969
Anthaxia bellamyi Bílý, 2002
Anthaxia bellissima Bílý, 1990
Anthaxia beloudjistana Bílý, 1983
Anthaxia beneckei Förster, 1885
Anthaxia beninensis Bílý, 2010
Anthaxia bercedoi Bílý, 2006
Anthaxia bergrothi Obenberger, 1928
Anthaxia berytensis Abeille de Perrin, 1895
Anthaxia bettagi Niehuis, 1983
Anthaxia bezdeki Oboril, 2006
Anthaxia bicolor Falderman, 1835
Anthaxia bicolorata Bílý & Svoboda, 2001
Anthaxia bilyi Curletti, 1984
Anthaxia binotata Chevrolat, 1838
Anthaxia blascoi Murria Beltrán & Murria Beltrán, 2005
Anthaxia boera Obenberger, 1922
Anthaxia boettcheri Obenberger, 1928
Anthaxia boissyi Levey, 1985
Anthaxia bonvouloirii Abeille de Perrin, 1869
Anthaxia borneicola Obenberger, 1924
Anthaxia bosdaghensis Obenberger, 1938
Anthaxia braunsi Obenberger, 1922
Anthaxia breviformis Kalashian, 1988
Anthaxia brevis Gory & Laporte, 1839
Anthaxia brevissima Bílý, 1990
Anthaxia brodskyi Bílý, 1982
Anthaxia brunneicolor Bílý, 1995
Anthaxia brunneipilis Bílý & Kubáň, 2010
Anthaxia buettikeri Bílý, 1979
Anthaxia buschi Assmann, 1870
Anthaxia cadiformis Bílý, 2010
Anthaxia caerulea Bílý, 2020
Anthaxia californica Obenberger, 1914
Anthaxia callicera Gerstäcker, 1884
Anthaxia candens (Panzer, 1793)
Anthaxia candensiformis Novak, 2006
Anthaxia candiota Obenberger, 1938
Anthaxia capensis Kerremans, 1903
Anthaxia capitata Kerremans, 1892
Anthaxia carbonaria Heyden & Heyden, 1865
Anthaxia carinivertex Bílý, 2008
Anthaxia carmelita Abeille de Perrin, 1900
Anthaxia carmen Obenberger, 1912
Anthaxia carniolica (Pongrácz, 1935)
Anthaxia carolinensis Obenberger, 1928
Anthaxia carya Wellso & Jackman, 2006
Anthaxia caseyi Obenberger, 1914
Anthaxia cashmirensis Obenberger, 1938
Anthaxia castanopsivora Bílý, 1998
Anthaxia castiliana Obenberger, 1914
Anthaxia caucasica Abeille de Perrin, 1900
Anthaxia caudipennis Bílý, 1983
Anthaxia cavazzutii Bílý, 1980
Anthaxia ceballosi Escalera, 1931
Anthaxia cebecci Baiocchi & Magnani, 2018
Anthaxia cedri Obenberger, 1938
Anthaxia chaerodrys Szallies, 2001
Anthaxia chevrieri Gory & Laporte, 1839
Anthaxia chinensis Kerremans, 1898
Anthaxia chlorocephala Chevrolat, 1838
Anthaxia chlorophylla Obenberger, 1928
Anthaxia cichorii (Olivier, 1790)
Anthaxia circe Obenberger, 1931
Anthaxia cleopatra Obenberger, 1913
Anthaxia clio Bílý, 1989
Anthaxia cobosi Descarpentries & Mateu, 1965
Anthaxia coelestis Théry, 1947
Anthaxia coelicolor Obenberger, 1922
Anthaxia collaris Kerremans, 1893
Anthaxia colmanti Kerremans, 1909
Anthaxia colonialis Obenberger, 1917
Anthaxia combusta Obenberger, 1922
Anthaxia confusa Gory, 1841
Anthaxia congolana Kerremans, 1909
Anthaxia congregata (Klug, 1829)
Anthaxia conradti Semenov, 1891
Anthaxia constricticollis Bílý, 2008
Anthaxia convexicollis Obenberger, 1938
Anthaxia convexiptera Bílý & Sakalian, 2014
Anthaxia coomani Baudon, 1963
Anthaxia corinthia Reiche & Saulcy, 1856
Anthaxia corsica Reiche, 1861
Anthaxia crassa Obenberger, 1922
Anthaxia crassicollis Heer, 1862
Anthaxia cratomerella Bílý & Svoboda, 2001
Anthaxia cratomerina Obenberger, 1922
Anthaxia croesus Villers, 1789
Anthaxia crotonivora Bílý, 2006
Anthaxia cuneiptera Bílý, 1999
Anthaxia cupressi Bílý, 2005
Anthaxia cupriola Barr, 1971
Anthaxia cuprivittis Obenberger, 1928
Anthaxia curlettii Magnani, 1993
Anthaxia cyanella Gory, 1841
Anthaxia cyaneonigra Svoboda, 1995
Anthaxia cyaneoptera Bílý, 1990
Anthaxia cyanescens Gory, 1841
Anthaxia cyanicolor Obenberger, 1941
Anthaxia cylindrica Abeille de Perrin, 1900
Anthaxia cymbiformis Bílý, 1990
Anthaxia cypraea Abeille de Perrin, 1900
Anthaxia cytheraea Obenberger, 1931
Anthaxia dahoi Baudon, 1966
Anthaxia danangensis Bílý, 1991
Anthaxia dauensis Obenberger, 1924
Anthaxia dayaka Bílý, 1991
Anthaxia dechambrei Bílý, 1991
Anthaxia decorsei Descarpentries, 1967
Anthaxia deimos Bílý, 2017
Anthaxia delagoana Obenberger, 1917
Anthaxia deleta Heer, 1865
Anthaxia denesi Svoboda, 2000
Anthaxia depressicollis Obenberger, 1922
Anthaxia depressifrons Bílý, 2006
Anthaxia deyrollei Bílý, 1998
Anthaxia diadema (Fischer von Waldheim, 1824)
Anthaxia dichroa Bílý, 1991
Anthaxia dilatipes Obenberger, 1928
Anthaxia dimidiata (Thunberg, 1789)
Anthaxia discicollis Gory & Laporte, 1839
Anthaxia dispar Kerremans, 1898
Anthaxia dives Obenberger, 1914
Anthaxia doris Heer, 1862
Anthaxia doukamensis Théry, 1937
Anthaxia douquetteae Descarpentries, 1969
Anthaxia drawida Obenberger, 1924
Anthaxia dundai Bílý, 1992
Anthaxia durbanensis Obenberger, 1938
Anthaxia duvivieri Kerremans, 1898
Anthaxia egena Kerremans, 1913
Anthaxia egeniformis Bílý & Kubáň, 2010
Anthaxia eggeri Brandl, 2003
Anthaxia elaeagni (Richter, 1945)
Anthaxia elberti Brandl, 1993
Anthaxia elegantula Obenberger, 1924
Anthaxia eloumdenica Oboril, 2006
Anthaxia emarginata Barr, 1971
Anthaxia embrikstrandella Obenberger, 1936
Anthaxia emmaae Descarpentries, 1967
Anthaxia ennediana Descarpentries & Mateu, 1965
Anthaxia eocenica Bílý, 1996
Anthaxia ephippiata Redtenbacher, 1850
Anthaxia episcopalis Théry, 1905
Anthaxia erato Bílý, 1989
Anthaxia erichbettagi Svoboda & Niehuis, 2002
Anthaxia escalerae Obenberger, 1913
Anthaxia escalerina Obenberger, 1923
Anthaxia escalerinella Novak, 1988
Anthaxia espanoli Cobos, 1954
Anthaxia eudoxia Obenberger, 1931
Anthaxia eugeniae Ganglbauer, 1885
Anthaxia eulioxa Obenberger, 1931
Anthaxia eumede Théry, 1947
Anthaxia eupoeta Obenberger, 1928
Anthaxia exasperans Cobos, 1958
Anthaxia exhumata Wickham, 1913
Anthaxia expansa LeConte, 1860
Anthaxia exsul Obenberger, 1914
Anthaxia facialis Erichson, 1843
Anthaxia fageli Descarpentries, 1955
Anthaxia fahraei Obenberger, 1930
Anthaxia fairmairella Obenberger, 1928
Anthaxia farah Bílý, 1983
Anthaxia farinigera Kraatz in Heyden & Kraatz, 1882
Anthaxia fedtschenkoi Semenov, 1895
Anthaxia feloi Liberto, 2001
Anthaxia fernandezi Cobos, 1953
Anthaxia fesana Bílý, 2006
Anthaxia fisheri Obenberger, 1928
Anthaxia flammifrons Semenov, 1891
Anthaxia flavicomes Abeille de Perrin, 1900
Anthaxia formosensis Bílý, 1980
Anthaxia fossicollis Kerremans, 1899
Anthaxia fossifrons Obenberger, 1928
Anthaxia fouqueti Bourgoin, 1923
Anthaxia francescoi Sparacio & Svoboda, 1999
Anthaxia fritschi Heyden, 1887
Anthaxia fuksai Obenberger, 1928
Anthaxia fulgidipennis Lucas, 1846
Anthaxia fulgurans (Schran, 1789)
Anthaxia funerula (Illiger, 1803)
Anthaxia furnissi Barr, 1971
Anthaxia gabonica Bílý, 2000
Anthaxia gansuensis Bílý, 1991
Anthaxia gebhardti Obenberger, 1924
Anthaxia gedrosiana Bílý, 1983
Anthaxia geiseltalensis Weidlich, 1987
Anthaxia genistae Bílý, 2006
Anthaxia gestroi Théry, 1927
Anthaxia ghazi Obenberger, 1938
Anthaxia gianassoi Curletti & Magnani, 1992
Anthaxia gianfrancoi Bílý, 2000
Anthaxia glabricollis Bílý, 2010
Anthaxia glabrifrons Abeille de Perrin, 1900
Anthaxia godeti Gory & Laporte, 1839
Anthaxia gongeti Oboril, 2006
Anthaxia gottwaldi Brandl & Mühle, 2008
Anthaxia graeca Bílý, 1984
Anthaxia granatensis Verdugo, 2013
Anthaxia griseocuprea Kiesenwetter, 1857
Anthaxia guanche Liberto, 2001
Anthaxia guizhouensis Bílý, 1996
Anthaxia gunningi Kerremans, 1911
Anthaxia gussmannae Bílý, 2002
Anthaxia hackeri Frivaldszky, 1884
Anthaxia hardenbergi Obenberger, 1924
Anthaxia hatayamai Bílý, 1990
Anthaxia hatchi Barr, 1971
Anthaxia haupti Bílý, 1995
Anthaxia hauzeri Kerremans, 1900
Anthaxia helferi Obenberger, 1928
Anthaxia helferiana Bílý, 1995
Anthaxia heliophila Théry, 1911
Anthaxia helvetica Stierlin, 1868
Anthaxia hemichrysis Abeille de Perrin, 1893
Anthaxia hepneri Bílý, 2006
Anthaxia herbertschmidi Novak, 1992
Anthaxia heringi Obenberger, 1938
Anthaxia hesperis Obenberger, 1931
Anthaxia heydeni Abeille de Perrin, 1893
Anthaxia heyrovskyi Bílý, 1992
Anthaxia hilaris Gory, 1841
Anthaxia hladili Bílý, 1984
Anthaxia holmi Bílý, 2002
Anthaxia holoptera Obenberger, 1914
Anthaxia holubi Obenberger, 1913
Anthaxia holynskii Bílý, 1990
Anthaxia hornburgi Bílý, 2008
Anthaxia hottentotta Obenberger, 1923
Anthaxia houskai Obenberger, 1946
Anthaxia hova Théry, 1905
Anthaxia hozaki Bílý, 1973
Anthaxia huashanica Bílý, 1993
Anthaxia hungarica (Scopoli, 1772)
Anthaxia hurdi Cobos, 1958
Anthaxia hydropica Théry, 1905
Anthaxia hyperlasia Obenberger, 1928
Anthaxia hypomelaena (Illiger, 1803)
Anthaxia hypsibata Obenberger, 1924
Anthaxia hypsigenia Obenberger, 1938
Anthaxia hyrcana Kirsch in Kiesenwetter & Kirsch, 1880
Anthaxia idae Obenberger, 1938
Anthaxia ignipennis Abeille de Perrin, 1882
Anthaxia ikuthana Obenberger, 1928
Anthaxia iliensis Obenberger, 1914
Anthaxia imperatrix Obenberger, 1928
Anthaxia imperfecta LeConte, 1860
Anthaxia impressifrons Bílý, 1990
Anthaxia impunctata Abeille de Perrin, 1909
Anthaxia indicola Théry, 1930
Anthaxia indigoptera Bílý, 1990
Anthaxia inornata (Randall, 1838)
Anthaxia insulaecola Obenberger, 1944
Anthaxia intermedia Obenberger, 1913
Anthaxia iranica (Richter, 1949)
Anthaxia irregularis Abeille de Perrin, 1909
Anthaxia israelita Abeille de Perrin, 1882
Anthaxia istriana Rosenhauer, 1847
Anthaxia iveta Svoboda, 2003
Anthaxia jakli Bílý, 1996
Anthaxia javanica Obenberger, 1924
Anthaxia jendeki Bílý & Sakalian, 2014
Anthaxia jenisi Bílý, 1006
Anthaxia jordanensis Bílý, 1984
Anthaxia juliae Liberto, 1996
Anthaxia kabateki Bílý, 2006
Anthaxia kabyliana Obenberger, 1914
Anthaxia kalalae Baiocchi & Magnani, 2011
Anthaxia kantneri Svoboda, 2000
Anthaxia karati Obo il & Bílý, 2003
Anthaxia karsanthiana Pic, 1917
Anthaxia kaszabi Cobos, 1966
Anthaxia katangae Obenberger, 1924
Anthaxia kedahae Fisher, 1933
Anthaxia keiseri Descarpentries, 1967
Anthaxia keniae Théry, 1941
Anthaxia kerremansiella Bílý, 1995
Anthaxia kervillei Théry, 1939
Anthaxia kheiliana Obenberger, 1931
Anthaxia kiesenwetteri Marseul, 1865
Anthaxia klessi Niehuis, 1991
Anthaxia kneuckeri Obenberger, 1920
Anthaxia knulli Obenberger, 1928
Anthaxia kochi Obenberger, 1938
Anthaxia kollari Marseul, 1865
Anthaxia kondleri Svoboda, 1999
Anthaxia krali Bílý & Kubáň, 2013
Anthaxia kreuzbergi Richter, 1944
Anthaxia krueperi Ganglbauer, 1885
Anthaxia kryzhanovskii (Alexeev, 1978)
Anthaxia kubani Bílý, 1986
Anthaxia kucerai Bílý & Svoboda, 2001
Anthaxia kurdistana Obenberger, 1912
Anthaxia kurosawai Bílý, 1989
Anthaxia lameyi Théry, 1911
Anthaxia lameyiformis Bílý, 1991
Anthaxia laotica Baudon, 1966
Anthaxia laticeps Abeille de Perrin, 1900
Anthaxia laticollis Bílý & Kubáň, 2009
Anthaxia lauta Alexeev, 1964
Anthaxia lecerfi Théry, 1930
Anthaxia leechi Cobos, 1958
Anthaxia lencinai Arnáiz & Bercedo, 2003
Anthaxia lewisi Bílý, 1990
Anthaxia lgockii Obenberger, 1917
Anthaxia liae Gobbi, 1983
Anthaxia libenae Oboril, 2006
Anthaxia lightfooti Obenberger, 1928
Anthaxia limpopoensis Obenberger, 1928
Anthaxia liuchangloi Obenberger, 1958
Anthaxia longipes Bílý & Kubáň, 2009
Anthaxia longipilis Bílý, 1998
Anthaxia lubopetra Bílý, 1995
Anthaxia lucens Küster, 1852
Anthaxia lucia Bílý, 2006
Anthaxia luctuosa Lucas, 1846
Anthaxia ludovicae Abeille de Perrin, 1900
Anthaxia lukesi Obenberger, 1931
Anthaxia lukjanovitshi Richter, 1949
Anthaxia lusitanica Obenberger, 1943
Anthaxia lyciae Magnani, 1996
Anthaxia machadoi Descarpentries, 1960
Anthaxia maculipennis (Haupt, 1956)
Anthaxia magnanii Baiocchi, 2011
Anthaxia magnifica Bílý, 1983
Anthaxia magnifrons Abeille de Perrin, 1907
Anthaxia majzlani Bílý, 1991
Anthaxia malachitica Abeille de Perrin, 1893
Anthaxia malayana Bílý, 1990
Anthaxia malickyi Obenberger, 1925
Anthaxia mamaj Pliginski, 1924
Anthaxia mamorensis Théry, 1930
Anthaxia manca (Linnaeus, 1767)
Anthaxia mancatula Abeille de Perrin, 1900
Anthaxia mannaea Baiocchi, 2011
Anthaxia maracaensis Théry, 1930
Anthaxia marani Obenberger, 1938
Anthaxia margarita Bílý, 1995
Anthaxia marginata (Thunberg, 1787)
Anthaxia marginifera Abeille de Perrin, 1907
Anthaxia margotana Novak, 1983
Anthaxia marmottani Bristout de Barneville, 1883
Anthaxia marshalli Stebbing, 1914
Anthaxia martinhauseri Niehuis, 1996
Anthaxia masculina Bílý, 1984
Anthaxia mashuna Obenberger, 1931
Anthaxia maximiliani Brechtel, 2000
Anthaxia meda Baiocchi, 2011
Anthaxia medvedevi Alexeev, 1975
Anthaxia medvedevorum (Alexeev, 1978)
Anthaxia mehli Bílý, 1990
Anthaxia meiseri Novak & Bílý, 1991
Anthaxia melancholica Gory, 1841
Anthaxia melanosoma Bílý, 2000
Anthaxia mendizabali Cobos, 1965
Anthaxia meregallii Curletti & Magnani, 1985
Anthaxia meronica Bílý, 1995
Anthaxia micantula Obenberger, 1924
Anthaxia midas Kiesenwetter, 1857
Anthaxia mikesai Novak & Bílý, 1991
Anthaxia millefolieta Svoboda in Kubá & Svoboda, 2006
Anthaxia millefolii (Fabricius, 1801)
Anthaxia mindanaoensis Fisher, 1922
Anthaxia mirabilis Zhicharev, 1918
Anthaxia miranda Deyrolle, 1864
Anthaxia miribella Obenberger, 1938
Anthaxia mogadorica Bílý, 2006
Anthaxia moira Obenberger, 1931
Anthaxia moises Obenberger, 1921
Anthaxia mokrzeckii Obenberger, 1927
Anthaxia monardi Théry, 1947
Anthaxia monbasica Théry, 1930
Anthaxia montana Kerremans, 1908
Anthaxia montivaga Bílý, 1984
Anthaxia morgani Théry, 1925
Anthaxia morio (Fabricius, 1793)
Anthaxia morosa Kerremans, 1892
Anthaxia morula Théry, 1947
Anthaxia moya Chûjô, 1970
Anthaxia muehlei Niehuis, 1983
Anthaxia muliebris Obenberger, 1918
Anthaxia multichroa Bílý, 1990
Anthaxia mundula Kiesenwetter, 1857
Anthaxia myrmidon Abeille de Perrin, 1891
Anthaxia mysteriosa Obenberger, 1917
Anthaxia nairobiensis Théry, 1941
Anthaxia nanissima Alexeev, 1964
Anthaxia nanula Casey, 1884
Anthaxia naviauxi Bílý, 1995
Anthaxia navicularis Bílý, 1991
Anthaxia negrei Cobos, 1953
Anthaxia neocuris (Fairmaire, 1901)
Anthaxia neofunerula Obenberger, 1942
Anthaxia nevadensis Obenberger, 1928
Anthaxia nickerli Obenberger, 1923
Anthaxia niehuisi Brandl, 1987
Anthaxia nigella Obenberger, 1928
Anthaxia nigricollis Abeille de Perrin, 1904
Anthaxia nigricornis Kerremans, 1898
Anthaxia nigritorum Kerremans, 1898
Anthaxia nigritula (Ratzeburg, 1837)
Anthaxia nigroaenea Bílý & Sakalian, 2014
Anthaxia nigrojubata Roubal, 1913
Anthaxia nitidiventris Fairmaire, 1901
Anthaxia nitidula (Linnaeus, 1758)
Anthaxia nitiduliformis Bílý, 1995
Anthaxia nixa Obenberger, 1931
Anthaxia njega Obenberger, 1922
Anthaxia nodifrons Théry, 1949
Anthaxia notabilis Obenberger, 1941
Anthaxia novickii Obenberger, 1938
Anthaxia nuda Bílý, 1990
Anthaxia nupta Kiesenwetter, 1857
Anthaxia nyassica Obst, 1903
Anthaxia nyssa Obenberger, 1931
Anthaxia obesa Abeille de Perrin, 1900
Anthaxia obesula Obenberger, 1924
Anthaxia obliquepilosa Obenberger, 1924
Anthaxia oborili Bílý, 2006
Anthaxia obscurans Obenberger, 1922
Anthaxia obtectans Kerremans, 1909
Anthaxia occidentalis Bílý, 2020
Anthaxia occipitalis Deyrolle, 1864
Anthaxia olifanti Obenberger, 1939
Anthaxia olivieri Gory & Laporte, 1839
Anthaxia olympica Kiesenwetter, 1880
Anthaxia oneili Obenberger, 1931
Anthaxia onilahyiana Bílý, 2011
Anthaxia ononidis Sánchez & Tolosa, 2006
Anthaxia ophthalmica Bílý, 1990
Anthaxia oreas Peyerimhoff, 1919
Anthaxia oregonensis Obenberger, 1942
Anthaxia ornatifrons Obenberger, 1928
Anthaxia osmastoni Stebbing, 1911
Anthaxia ovaciki Novak, 1994
Anthaxia pacata Kerremans, 1913
Anthaxia palaestinensis Obenberger, 1946
Anthaxia palawanensis Bílý & Kubán, 2012
Anthaxia pallas Cobos, 1967
Anthaxia pallida Heer, 1862
Anthaxia paphia Novak & Makris, 2002
Anthaxia paradoxa (Bílý, 1990)
Anthaxia parallela Gory & Laporte, 1839
Anthaxia parapleuralis Obenberger, 1929
Anthaxia pardoi Cobos, 1966
Anthaxia parvula Baiocchi & Magnani, 2007
Anthaxia passerinii (Pecchioli, 1837)
Anthaxia patrizii Théry, 1938
Anthaxia patsyae Baiocchi, 2008
Anthaxia pauliani Descarpentries, 1967
Anthaxia pecani Théry, 1938
Anthaxia pengi Bílý, 1990
Anthaxia peninsularis Bílý, 1990
Anthaxia pennsylvanica Obenberger, 1914
Anthaxia peratra Obenberger, 1928
Anthaxia permisa Abeille de Perrin, 1904
Anthaxia perrieri (Fairmaire, 1900)
Anthaxia perrini Obenberger, 1918
Anthaxia persuperba Obenberger, 1912
Anthaxia peyrierasi Descarpentries, 1967
Anthaxia philippinensis Bílý & Kubán, 2012
Anthaxia phobos Bílý, 2017
Anthaxia phyllanthi Obenberger, 1956
Anthaxia pienaarica Obenberger, 1928
Anthaxia pilifrons Kerremans, 1898
Anthaxia pinda Bílý & Baiocchi, 2009
Anthaxia pinguis Kiesenwetter, 1880
Anthaxia platysoma Abeille de Perrin, 1891
Anthaxia plaviscikovi Obenberger, 1935
Anthaxia pleuralis Fairmaire, 1883
Anthaxia plicata Kiesenwetter, 1859
Anthaxia pochoni Herman, 1969
Anthaxia podolica Mannerheim, 1837
Anthaxia porella Barr, 1974
Anthaxia potanini Ganglbauer, 1890
Anthaxia praecellens Kerremans, 1909
Anthaxia praeclara Mannerheim, 1837
Anthaxia prasina Horn, 1882
Anthaxia prepsli Bílý, 1995
Anthaxia primaeva Heer, 1865
Anthaxia proteiformis Bílý, 1993
Anthaxia proteus Saunders, 1873
Anthaxia protractipennis Obenberger, 1914
Anthaxia protractula Obenberger, 1931
Anthaxia pseudocongregata Descarpentries & Bruneau de Miré, 1963
Anthaxia pseudofunerula Bílý, 2006
Anthaxia pseudogenistae Bílý, 2006
Anthaxia pseudohilaris Obenberger, 1939
Anthaxia pseudonitidula Svoboda in Kubán & Svoboda, 2006
Anthaxia psittacina Heyden, 1887
Anthaxia puchneri Bílý & Sakalian, 2014
Anthaxia puella Bílý, 1980
Anthaxia pulex Abeille de Perrin, 1893
Anthaxia pumila (Klug, 1829)
Anthaxia punctifera (Haupt, 1956)
Anthaxia punjabensis Obenberger, 1928
Anthaxia purpureifrons Bílý, 2010
Anthaxia pygaera Obenberger, 1931
Anthaxia pyropyga Bílý, 1998
Anthaxia pyrosoma Bílý, 1006
Anthaxia quadrifoveolata Solsky, 1871
Anthaxia quadrimaculata (Haupt, 1956)
Anthaxia quadripunctata (Linnaeus, 1758)
Anthaxia quercata (Fabricius, 1801)
Anthaxia quercicola Wellso, 1974
Anthaxia raharizoninai Descarpentries, 1967
Anthaxia reitteri Obenberger, 1913
Anthaxia retamae Bílý, 1995
Anthaxia reticollis Quedenfeldt, 1886
Anthaxia reticulata Motschulsky, 1859
Anthaxia retifer LeConte, 1860
Anthaxia richteri Stepanov, 1953
Anthaxia ringenbachi Baiocchi, 2004
Anthaxia robusticornis Bílý, 1990
Anthaxia rondoni Baudon, 1962
Anthaxia rossica Daniel, 1903
Anthaxia rothkirchi Obenberger, 1922
Anthaxia roxana Bílý, 1983
Anthaxia rubididorsa (Haupt, 1956)
Anthaxia rubifrons Kerremans, 1914
Anthaxia rubrocyanea Novak, 2008
Anthaxia rubromarginata Miwa & Chûjô, 1935
Anthaxia rudebecki Descarpentries, 1970
Anthaxia rudis Kerremans, 1893
Anthaxia rugicollis Lucas, 1846
Anthaxia rungsi Baudon, 1958
Anthaxia ruth Bílý & Kubáň, 2010
Anthaxia rutilipennis Abeille de Perrin, 1891
Anthaxia sagartiana Baiocchi & Magnani, 2011
Anthaxia sahelica Descarpentries & Bruneau de Miré, 1963
Anthaxia salicis (Fabricius, 1776)
Anthaxia samai Curletti & Magnani, 1992
Anthaxia sarawackensis Deyrolle, 1864
Anthaxia scabra Théry, 1905
Anthaxia schah Abeille de Perrin, 1904
Anthaxia schoenmanni Novak, 1984
Anthaxia schroederiana Bílý, 1997
Anthaxia scorzonerae (Frivaldszky, 1838)
Anthaxia sculptipennis Obenberger, 1924
Anthaxia sculpturata Barr, 1971
Anthaxia scurra Bílý & Brodsky, 1982
Anthaxia scutellaris (Géné, 1839)
Anthaxia sedilloti Abeille de Perrin, 1893
Anthaxia segurensis Obenberger, 1924
Anthaxia semicuprea Küster, 1852
Anthaxia semiramis Obenberger, 1913
Anthaxia senicula (Schran, 1789)
Anthaxia senilis Wollaston, 1864
Anthaxia sepulchralis (Fabricius, 1801)
Anthaxia sepulchraloides Cobos, 1962
Anthaxia serena Daniel, 1903
Anthaxia serripennis Obenberger, 1936
Anthaxia setipennis Obenberger, 1928
Anthaxia sexualis Obenberger, 1928
Anthaxia seyrigi Descarpentries, 1967
Anthaxia shirasensis Obenberger, 1940
Anthaxia siamensis Bílý, 2005
Anthaxia sicardi Descarpentries, 1967
Anthaxia sichuanica Bílý, 1993
Anthaxia signaticollis (Krynicki, 1832)
Anthaxia simandli Baiocchi, 2013
Anthaxia simiola Casey, 1884
Anthaxia simonae Verdugo, Niehuis & Gómez de Dios, 2017
Anthaxia sinica Bílý, 1994
Anthaxia sjoestedti Kerremans, 1908
Anthaxia smaragdiceps Théry, 1941
Anthaxia smaragdula Gebhardt, 1928
Anthaxia socotrensis Bílý, 1984
Anthaxia sordidata Gestro, 1895
Anthaxia sphenoptera Bílý & Kubáň, 2010
Anthaxia spinolae Gory & Laporte, 1839
Anthaxia spinosa Abeille de Perrin, 1900
Anthaxia splendida Chevrolat, 1838
Anthaxia sponsa Kiesenwetter, 1857
Anthaxia stateira Bílý, 1983
Anthaxia stepanovi Richter, 1949
Anthaxia sternalis Abeille de Perrin, 1895
Anthaxia stevensoni Théry, 1932
Anthaxia strigata LeConte, 1859
Anthaxia sturanyii Obenberger, 1914
Anthaxia suaveola Obenberger, 1924
Anthaxia subprasina Cobos, 1958
Anthaxia subviolacea Kerremans, 1898
Anthaxia succinicola Descarpentries, 1967
Anthaxia sudana Obenberger, 1928
Anthaxia sulcicollis Obenberger, 1928
Anthaxia superba Abeille de Perrin, 1900
Anthaxia suzannae Théry, 1942
Anthaxia svobodai Bílý, 2005
Anthaxia syrdarjensis Obenberger, 1934
Anthaxia syriaca Bílý & Kubá, 2004
Anthaxia tacita Kerremans, 1913
Anthaxia taiwanensis Bílý, 1989
Anthaxia tamdaoensis Bílý, 1998
Anthaxia tanjorensis Obenberger, 1938
Anthaxia tanzanica Bílý & Kubáň, 2010
Anthaxia tarsalis Barr, 1971
Anthaxia tauricola Magnani, 2002
Anthaxia tazaotana Cobos, 1956
Anthaxia teirone Obenberger, 1931
Anthaxia teloukatiae Descarpentries & Bruneau de Miré, 1963
Anthaxia tenella Kiesenwetter, 1858
Anthaxia tenuicula Boheman, 1860
Anthaxia thailandica Bílý, 1990
Anthaxia thalassophila Abeille de Perrin, 1900
Anthaxia theryana Bílý, 1995
Anthaxia thessalica Brandl, 1981
Anthaxia thunbergi Gory & Laporte, 1839
Anthaxia tianshanica Bílý, 1984
Anthaxia tibetana Bílý, 2003
Anthaxia togata Abeille de Perrin, 1882
Anthaxia togataeformis Novak, 2001
Anthaxia tomyris Obenberger, 1913
Anthaxia tonkinea Baudon, 1960
Anthaxia toyamai Bílý, 1989
Anthaxia tractata Abeille de Perrin, 1901
Anthaxia tragacanthi Iablokoff-Khnzorian, 1957
Anthaxia transvalensis Obenberger, 1922
Anthaxia triangularis Gory, 1841
Anthaxia tricolor Kerremans, 1912
Anthaxia trivalis Gory, 1841
Anthaxia truncata Abeille de Perrin, 1900
Anthaxia tuerki Ganglbauer, 1886
Anthaxia turana Obenberger, 1914
Anthaxia turcica Svoboda, 1994
Anthaxia turcomanica Obenberger, 1937
Anthaxia turkestanica Obenberger, 1912
Anthaxia turnai Bílý & Svoboda, 2001
Anthaxia turneri Obenberger, 1931
Anthaxia ulmi Bílý, 2005
Anthaxia umbellatarum (Fabricius, 1787)
Anthaxia ursulae Niehuis, 1989
Anthaxia vadoni Descarpentries, 1967
Anthaxia vansoni Théry, 1955
Anthaxia vejdovskyi Obenberger, 1914
Anthaxia ventricosa Théry, 1905
Anthaxia verdugoi Bílý, 2006
Anthaxia vientianei Baudon, 1960
Anthaxia vietnamica Bílý, 1998
Anthaxia villiersi Baudon, 1959
Anthaxia violacea Bílý, 1977
Anthaxia violaceiceps Obenberger, 1922
Anthaxia violaceiventris Deyrolle, 1864
Anthaxia virescens Kerremans, 1893
Anthaxia viridicornis (Say, 1823)
Anthaxia viridicyanea Weidlich, 1987
Anthaxia viridifrons Gory, 1841
Anthaxia vittipennis Kerremans, 1909
Anthaxia vittula Kiesenwetter, 1857
Anthaxia vladivostokana Obenberger, 1938
Anthaxia volkovitshi Bílý, 1979
Anthaxia wallowae Obenberger, 1942
Anthaxia weidlichi Bílý, 1996
Anthaxia wethloi Obenberger, 1940
Anthaxia weyersi Kerremans, 1900
Anthaxia winkleri Obenberger, 1914
Anthaxia wittmeri Bílý, 1979
Anthaxia xiahensis Bílý, 1995
Anthaxia yunnana Bílý, 1990
Anthaxia zanzibarica Kerremans, 1898
Anthaxia zarazagai Arnáiz & Bercedo, 2003

References

Buprestidae genera